This page shows the progress of Shrewsbury Town F.C. in the 2010–11 football season. This year they play their games in League Two in the English league system.

League Two results

FA Cup results

Shrewsbury entered and left the FA Cup in the first round proper.

League Cup results

Football League Trophy results

Squad statistics
Appearances for competitive matches only

Notes

References

Shrewsbury Town
Shrewsbury Town F.C. seasons